A gawęda is a story; especially, one that belongs to a kind of Polish epic literary genre.

History
Gawęda is a genre of Polish folk literature.

The term also describes a literary work, stylized as an oral tale, characterized by freedom of composition, rich in digressions, and written in language close to colloquial language, that presented a picture of Sarmatian szlachta (nobility, or gentry) manners and morals.

During the Romantic period, in the first half of the 19th century, the genre developed as the "szlachta gawęda".  It told of the lives and manners of the nobility, affirming the Sarmatian world of values. The leading author in this genre was Henryk Rzewuski (Pamiątki Soplicy—Memoirs of Soplica, 1839–41). Other authors in this line included K. Gaszyński (Kontuszowe pogadanki—Kontusz Chats), Władysław Syrokomla (Urodzony Jan Dęboróg—Jan Dęboróg), Wincenty Pol (Wieczór przy kominku—An Evening by the Fire), A. Gorczyński, K.W. Wójcicki, and Ignacy Chodźko (Pamiętniki kwestarza—Memoirs of a Collector for Charity).

Gawęda elements may be found in works by Adam Mickiewicz (Pan Tadeusz), Juliusz Słowacki (Preliminaria peregrynacji do Ziemi Świętej JO. księcia Radziwiłła Sierotki—Preliminaries to the Peregrination to the Holy Land of Prince Radziwiłł the Orphan), and in Henryk Sienkiewicz's Trilogy. The szlachta gawęda played a great role in the development of the Polish historical novel.

A twentieth-century practitioner of gawęda was Melchior Wańkowicz (1892–1974).

See also
Saga

Notes

References
"Gawęda," Encyklopedia Powszechna PWN (PWN Universal Encyclopedia), Warsaw, Państwowe Wydawnictwo Naukowe, vol. 2, 1974, p. 26. 
"Gawęda," Encyklopedia Polski (Encyclopedia of Poland), Kraków, Wydawnictwo Ryszard Kluszczyński, 1996, p. 175.

Polish literature
Literary genres